Diana Golbi (born January 16, 1992) is an Israeli-Russian singer and actress, the eighth winner of Kokhav Nolad, the Israeli version of Pop Idol. Golbi is the third female participant to win the show (following Ninet Tayeb on the first season and Roni Dalumi on the seventh season).

Personal life
Golbi was born as Diana Igorevna Golovanova in Moscow, Russia. When she turned four, her parents decided to immigrate to Israel, and resided in the city of Holon. During her childhood, Golbi "fell in love" with the stage. She studied theatre in an American studio, and when she was 12, she went to perform in a big theatre in St. Petersburg. She served as an instructor in the Teleprocessing Corps of the Israel Defense Forces.

Golbi also loves football. She played on a girl team in Petah Tikva, coached by her father, even though she did prefer performing on stage. During 2008 Golbi and her friends formed a rock band, called HaRusim (Hebrew: הרוסים). HaRusim is a double meaning: it means both "The Ruined Ones" and "The Russian Ones" in Hebrew, since the members of the band are all Russian originally.
Studied acting in the Nissan Nativ Acting Studio in Tel Aviv 2015-2018

Kokhav Nolad 8
During 2010, Golbi went to audition for the eighth season of Kokhav Nolad and was accepted. In the night of September 4, 2010, she won 53% of the votes and beat Idan Amedi, and was therefore crowned as the winner of Kokhav Nolad 8. She won a production contract from the music producer Louis Lahav.

Kohav Nolad performances

HaKokhav HaBa 
In 2017, Golbi entered the 4th season of HaKokhav HaBa. In her first performance she sang "Alive", a song which was originally sung by Sia. She got a score of 95% for that performance, which was broadcast on Israeli TV on January 2, 2017. She became the runner-up of the show, after Imri Ziv.

References

External links

 
 Diana Golbi's page on mako

1992 births
Russian emigrants to Israel
21st-century Israeli women singers
Kokhav Nolad winners
Living people
Singers from Moscow
People from Holon
Israeli people of Russian-Jewish descent